Fiorenzo Chatrer (born October 1, 1987 in Breda) is a Dutch footballer who played for Eerste Divisie club FC Oss during the 2006-2007 football season.

Club career
Chatrer played in the NAC and VVV-Venlo youth systems and after leaving Oss he played for amateur sides Advendo, Rood Wit Sint Willibrord, JEKA and the Gunners.

References

1987 births
Living people
Footballers from Breda
Association football forwards
Dutch footballers
TOP Oss players
Eerste Divisie players